The Santa Barbara Open was a golf tournament on the LPGA Tour from 1987 to 1988. It was played at  two courses in the Santa Barbara, California area: Sandpiper Golf Club in Goleta and La Purisima Golf Course in Lompoc. In 1987, the field was split for the first two rounds, half playing on each course, then switching to the other course on the second day. the final round was played at Sandpiper. In 1988, the first round was played at Sandpiper, and the second and third rounds were played at La Purisima.

Winners
1988 Rosie Jones
1987 Jan Stephenson

References

External links
Sandpiper Golf Club
La Purisima Golf Course

Former LPGA Tour events
Golf in California
Sports in Santa Barbara County, California
Women's sports in California